Dr. Buzzard's Original Savannah Band was a big band- and swing-influenced disco band that was formed in the Bronx, New York. The band is best known for its number-one US dance hit "Cherchez La Femme/C'est si bon," from its self-titled debut album.

History
The band was conceived by brothers Stony Browder Jr. (February 7, 1949 – October 6, 2001) and Thomas Browder (also known as August Darnell, born August 12, 1950), with the former writing music and the latter lyrics. They started the band in 1974 with singer Cory Daye (born April 25, 1952), drummer Mickey Sevilla, and percussionist Andy Hernandez (Coati Mundi). They released three albums between 1976 and 1979. Their music blended disco beats with rhythms from genres including calypso, rhumba, cha-cha-chá, and compas. The Browders, who were both multiracial, wrote songs embracing multiculturalism over stories about tragic mulattoes. A smaller lineup known as Dr. Buzzard's Savannah Band (omitting the word "original") also released a fourth album in 1984. They were frequent performers at Studio 54. Darnell and Hernandez went on to form Kid Creole and the Coconuts and Elbow Bones and the Racketeers.

Cory Daye also pursued a successful solo career. In 1979, she released the album Cory and Me. The album produced a single, "Pow Wow" b/w Green Light", which peaked on the U.S. Billboard Hot 100 at #76 later that year. The track "Wiggle and Giggle All Night" became a Top 20 hit in the Netherlands.

Stony Browder Jr. died in 2001.

Members
Stony Browder Jr. - music, piano, vocals (1976–79, 1984)
Thomas Browder - lyrics, bass, vocals (1976–79)
Cory Daye - vocals (1976–79, 1984)
Mickey Sevilla - drums (1976–79, 1984)
Andy Hernandez - percussion (1976–79)

Discography

Studio albums

Compilation albums 
 The Very Best of Dr. Buzzard's Original Savannah Band (1996, RCA)
 The Disco Kids (2005, Sony BMG)

Singles

Copyright lawsuit
	
In 2022, songwriters L. Russell Brown and Sandy Linzer filed a copyright lawsuit against Dua Lipa claiming that her song "Levitating" infringed on their 1979 song "Wiggle and Giggle All Night".

See also 
 List of number-one dance hits (United States)
 List of artists who reached number one on the US Dance chart
 Kid Creole and the Coconuts

References

Notes

External links 
 "Savannah Band Is Waiting for You, American" by Kevin McMahon
 The band's MySpace page
 Coati Mundi's MySpace page
 August Darnell interview by Pete Lewis, 'Blues & Soul' August 2011

American disco groups
American dance music groups